Sidyma apicalis is a moth in the subfamily Arctiinae. It was described by Frederic Moore in 1878. It is found in Sikkim, India.

References

Moths described in 1878
Arctiini